River Ridge is a 2012 dramatic web series created by Tyler Ford and co-produced by Ford and lead actress Signy Coleman. The series was described as "the interwoven kaleidoscope of the residents of a small east coast town and their familiar and relatable circumstances." The series was announced in 2010, repeatedly delayed, released in January 2012 and lasted for six episodes of 11 minutes each.

Synopsis
The series features dramatic, real-life stories such as strained familial relationships, young love, prejudice, economic hardships, and mental illness. The goal of River Ridge, Ford explains, was to "create a patchwork of interconnected stories."

Cast and characters
Signy Coleman as Sharon Reeves: A devoted mother, daughter, sister, and friend, who is forced to confront the history of dysfunction that she shares with her distant sister, Kimberly.
Matthew Daniell as Nicholas 'Shaw' Shaw: Referred to simply as “Shaw”, he is a star athlete struggling to define his identity.
Danielle DiLorenzo as Kenzie Collins: An independent, tough New York City native who abandons her dreams for love, only to find her new life suffocating and empty.
Mark Doherty as Silas Carter: A blue-collar, tough foreman of a construction company, who wears his heart on his sleeve.
Beth Ehlers as Coryn Foster: The economically plagued mother of Wyatt, battling childhood trauma and the unraveling effects of mental illness.
Seth Ford as Wyatt Foster: A rebellious teenager, coping with the repercussions and negative effects of his mother's mental state.
Christina Jackson as Reese Bradley: An intelligent, hard working high school senior focused on her academic aspirations.
Matt McAbee as Avery Reeves: A gifted baseball player navigating scholastic pressures, and the intolerance of an unexpected blossoming relationship.
Isabella Nolan as Ruby Jensen: The resilient daughter of damaged parents.
Julie Pinson as Kimberly Reeves: The sister of Sharon and a musician who abandoned her roots to pursue her dreams. The journey of a dreamer however is not without sacrifice and her return to River Ridge begins a quest for resolve.
Jon Prescott as Brad Rylan: The prodigal son of a wealthy family, whose disintegrating romantic relationship throws him on a path of self-discovery forcing him to re-evaluate his purpose and destiny.
Shannon Sturges as Blythe Jensen: The innately nurturing and compassionate high school guidance counselor, trying to balance the weight of her work with newly found romance.
Carrie Watt as Emily 'Emme' Foster: A free spirited teenager filled with intense passion to capture the beauty of the world through her art, which is also used as an escape from her unstable family environment.

Production
In a July 2010 interview, co-producer and lead actress Signy Coleman revealed the “impending” production of River Ridge.

Nearly a year later, in May 2011, production had only resulted in a trailer. At that time, co-producer Tyler Ford stated that in many ways River Ridge was inspired by his own experiences growing up in New Castle, Delaware.

The first episode, which ran 17 minutes, was posted to the web in January 2012, followed in consecutive weeks by five more 11 minute episodes.  Production ended, and the series did not return after February 2012.

Setting
River Ridge is set in the fictional east coast town of River Ridge and is filmed on location in the historical town of New Castle, Delaware.

Episodes

References

External links
 

Internet soap operas
American drama web series